Cyathochaeta avenacea is a sedge of the family Cyperaceae that is native to Australia.

The plant blooms between November and March producing brown flowers.

In Western Australia it is found along the coast in peaty-swampy areas along the coast of the Wheatbelt, Peel, South West, Great Southern and Goldfields-Esperance regions where it grows in lateritic loam to sandy soils.

References

Plants described in 1878
Flora of Western Australia
avenacea
Taxa named by Robert Brown (botanist, born 1773)